Umar Edelkhanov (born 29 December 1963) is a Russian weightlifter. He competed in the men's featherweight event at the 1996 Summer Olympics.

References

External links
 

1963 births
Living people
Russian male weightlifters
Olympic weightlifters of Russia
Weightlifters at the 1996 Summer Olympics
20th-century Russian people
21st-century Russian people
People from Groznensky District
Sportspeople from Chechnya